The 1997 Taça de Portugal Final was the final match of the 1996–97 Taça de Portugal, the 57th season of the Taça de Portugal, the premier Portuguese football cup competition organized by the Portuguese Football Federation (FPF). The match was played on 10 June 1997 at the Estádio Nacional in Oeiras, and opposed two Primeira Liga sides Benfica and Boavista. Boavista defeated Benfica 3–2 to claim the Taça de Portugal for a fifth time in their history. 

In Portugal, the final was televised live on RTP. As a result of Boavista winning the Taça de Portugal, Os Axadrezados qualified for the 1997 Supertaça Cândido de Oliveira where they took on 1996–97 Primeira Divisão winners Porto.

Match

Details

References

1997
1996–97 in Portuguese football
S.L. Benfica matches
Boavista F.C. matches